The Kilgore Boomers were a minor league baseball team that played in the East Texas League in 1939 and 1940. It was based in the American city of Kilgore, Texas and replaced the Kilgore Rangers. In 1939, under manager Jimmy Dalrymple, the team won the league championship.

The squad featured numerous Major League Baseball players in 1939: Walter Brown, Clyde Kluttz, Ray Sanders and Tommy Warren suited up for the team. It featured no major leaguers in 1940.

References

Baseball teams established in 1939
Defunct minor league baseball teams
Baseball teams disestablished in 1940
1939 establishments in Texas
1940 disestablishments in Texas
Defunct baseball teams in Texas
East Texas League teams